Chinese Internet slang refers to various kinds of Internet slang used by people on the Chinese Internet. It is often coined in response to events, the influence of the mass media and foreign culture, and the desires of users to simplify and update the Chinese language. Slang that first appears on the Internet is often adopted to become current in everyday life. It includes content relating to all aspects of social life, mass media, economic, and political topics and the like. Internet slang is arguably the fastest-changing aspect of the language, created by a number of different influences—technology, mass media and foreign culture amongst others.

The categories given below are not exclusive and are used distinguish the different kinds of Chinese internet slang. Some phrases may belong in more than one category.

Numeronyms 
 1314 – "Forever", usually preceded by a phrase such as "I love you" or the similar. 1314 (pinyin: yīsānyīsì) represents 一生一世 "one lifetime, throughout one's life" (pinyin: yīshēng yīshì).
 213 – 2B, 二屄, a person who is very stupid. 
 233 – "laughter," 2333 (pinyin: èrsānsān) represents 哈哈哈 (pinyin: hāhāhā).
 4242 – "Yes," "Affirmative," or "It is", 4242 (pinyin: sìèrsìèr) represents 是啊是啊 (pinyin: shìa shìa).
 484 – "If" represents 是不是 (means yes or no).
 520 – "I love you".  520 (pinyin: wǔ'èrlíng) represents 我爱你 (pinyin: wǒ ài nǐ).
 555 "(crying)". 555 (pinyin: wǔwǔwǔ) represents 呜呜呜 (pinyin: wūwūwū) the sound of tearful crying, but it is not towards the feeling of sadness, but more of pitiful.
 666 – "cool" or "nice." 666 (pinyin: liùliùliù) represents 溜溜溜 (pinyin: liùliùliù); or smooth/slick (comes from Chinese gaming slang, where gamers would put '666' in the chat after seeing another showing an impressive skill)
 777 - "666 but better," 777 is a play on the numeronym '666' that gamers put in the chat after seeing another show an even more impressive skill.
 7451 or 7456 – "I'm angry." 7451 (pinyin: qīsìwǔyī) or 7456 (pinyin: qīsìwǔliù) represents 气死我了 (pinyin: qìsǐwǒle) lit.: I'm furious.
 748 – "Go and die!", 748 (pinyin: qīsìbā) represents 去死吧 (pinyin: qùsǐba), the equivalent of "Get lost!", or "Go to hell!"
 87 – (bitchy, or idiocy/idiot). 87 (pinyin: lit. bāqī, or loosely, báichī) represents "bitchy" (English) or 白痴 idiocy/idiot (Mandarin).
 88 – "Bye bye" (goodbye). 88 (pinyin: bābā) represents "bye bye" (English). 886 also has the same meaning as "88".
 94 – "So," "But," etc.  94 (jiǔsì) represents 就是 (pinyin: jiùshì), the conjunction meaning "so," "but," "just like," "in the same way as," etc.
 99 – "The wish for a couple to be together for long time",99(pinyin:jiǔjiǔ)represents 久久 (pinyin:jiǔjiǔ),it means something(in the word '99' usually means love) lasts a long time.
 995 – "Help", "Save me!", 995 (pinyin: jiǔjiǔwǔ) represents 救救我 (pinyin: jiùjiù wǒ).
 996 – The 996 working hour system (pinyin: jiǔjiǔliù)
999 - It has a similar meaning to '666'. Because '9' looks like '6' upside down, so it usually mean something is even better than things we call '666'.It also has another meaning just like '99' for the same reason.

Latin abbreviations 

Chinese users commonly use a pinyin-enabled QWERTY keyboard. Upper-case letters are easy to type and require no transformation. (Lower-case letters spell words which are changed into Chinese characters). Latin alphabet abbreviations (rather than Chinese characters) are also sometimes used to evade censorship.

 LZ – lóu zhǔ (楼主), the owner of the thread, the original poster.
 A片 – A piān, an 'adult' video.
 BZ – bǎnzhǔ (版主), the moderator of an internet discussion forum
 BS – bǐshì (鄙视), to despise (verb).
 JB – jiba (鸡巴), vulgar word referring to a man's private parts(Male genitalia)
 CCAV – China Central Adult Video, ironic nickname for China Central Television (CCTV).
 CN – chǔnǚ or chǔnán (处女 or 处男), virgin (female or male) 
 CNM – cāonǐmā, fuck your mother. The most common way of cursing in China. Some phrase it "sao ni ma".
 CNMB – cāonǐmābī, fuck your mother's vagina. used as an insult.
 FL – fàláng (发廊), hairdresser, possibly providing sex services
 FQ – fènqīng (愤青), indignant/angry youth
 GC – gāocháo (高潮), orgasm
 GCD – gòngchǎndǎng (共产党), the Communist Party
 GG – gēge (哥哥), literally older brother, by extension male friend, or guy Nowadays, people say "GG" means you do a good job on the game (These two letters also mean "Good Game.") 
 GD – gōudā (勾搭) gang up with
 HLL – huá lì lì (华丽丽), glamorous, high-profile.
 JC – jǐngchá (警察), police
 JC – jié cāo (节操,) moral integrity,moral principle
 JJ – jījī (鸡鸡), reference to the male genitalia
 JP – jípǐn (极品), high quality, but used ironically for things that are extremely low quality
 JY – jīngyīng (精英), elite, right-wing intellectuals, but also jīngyè (精液) sperm, semen
 KD – kēngdiē (坑爹), to cheat someone
 KJ – kǒujiāo (口交), oral sex
 LD – lǐng dǎo (领导), leadership, i.e. the government and officials
 ML – to make love
 MM – mèimèi (妹妹 or 美美 or 美妹 or 美眉), little sister, young girl, pretty girl. Often written as “MM,” which usually refers to a young girl or pretty girls
 NB – niúbī (牛逼), an arrogant, annoying person, but also used positively for an awesome, impressive, person, similar to "badass"
 NMSL – nǐmāsǐle (你妈死了), lit. "Your mom is dead.", used as an insult
 PG – pìgu (屁股), buttocks
 P民 – pì mín (屁民), rabble, hoi polloi, ordinary people, often used ironically
 PLGG – piàoliàng  gēgē (漂亮哥哥),  pretty boy  (see GG above)
 PLMM – piàoliàng mèimei (漂亮妹妹), beautiful girl (see MM above)
 PS or P出 – Photoshopped (picture)
 RS  – rèsōu (热搜), popular search term
 SB – shǎbī (傻逼), lit. "dumb cunt", commonly used as an insult
 SMT – shāmǎtè (杀马特), unusual appearance and strange style
 SN – sauna, reinforced by its Chinese translation sāngná
 TMD – tāmāde (他妈的), common Chinese expletive used for 'damn, fuck,' and the like
 TT – tàotao (套套), condom
 TTL - Tomboy's Love/太甜了(too sweet)
 WDR – wàidìrén (外地人), stranger, outsider, foreigner
 WSND – "Wo Shi Ni Die", "I am your father"
 XJ – xiǎojiě (小姐), young woman, but also commonly for prostitute
 XSWL – xiàosǐwǒlè (笑死我了), LMAO
 YD – yín dàng (淫荡), obscene, perverted
 YP – yuē pào (约炮), casual sex 
 YQZH – yǒuqiánzhēnhǎo(有钱真好), so good to be rich, or sometimes, admire another who is rich 
 YY – yì yín (意淫), fantasizing, sexual thoughts
 YYDS – yǒngyuǎn de shén (永远滴神), “eternal God” and describes an outstanding person or thing.
 ZF – zhèngfǔ (政府), government
 ZG – zhōngguó (中国), China|
 WDNMD - Wǒ diào nǐ mā de （我屌你妈的), Fuck you, commonly used in games such as CSGO.
 SMWY - Shénme wányì (什么玩意), What the Fuck, commonly used in video games.
 GB - Gǒu bī (狗逼) (勾八),  stupid.
 LJ - Lā Jī(垃圾), calling you out for being bad at playing a certain video game.
 CB Southern Peninsular Malaysian Hokkien   Jī bài（鸡拜), (Vagina) A Hokkien slang for fuck.
 LJ Southern Peninsular Malaysian Hokkien Lǎn jiào(懒觉), A hokkien slang for penis.
 LC Malaysian Cantonese - Lan si (撚屎) - commonly used for someone being uptight.
 DLLM Cantonese - Diu lei lou mou (屌你老母), commonly used phrase in the internet as fuck you.
 AZ - A zhè （啊这), used as shocked expression, something happened out of the ordinary.
 WC - Wǒ chāo（我焯), i'm screwed.
 LCLY Malaysian Cantonese - lan si lan yong （撚屎撚樣） A uptight arrogant person who only talks about themselves.
 NJHL Malaysian Mandarin - Nǐ jiù hǎo lo  (你就好咯）, you have good things, and i'm miserable.

Chinese characters abbreviations 
 Dear (亲 qīn) – short for 亲爱的 (qīn'àide), friendly term of respect, address, and the like
 Don't know (不造 Bù zào) – A contraction of standard Chinese "I don't know" (不知道 Bù zhīdào)
 Life is so hard that some lies are better not exposed (人艰不拆 rénjiānbùchāi) – This comes from the lyrics of a song entitled “Shuo Huang” (Lies), by Taiwanese singer Yoga Lin. The phrase implies a situation that is too harsh to be contemplated. For example, it can be used to describe a large group of unemployed recent college graduates. This slang reflects that some people, especially young people in China, are disappointed by reality. The phrase is often paired with “too tired to love” (see below).
 Short, ugly and poor (矮丑穷 ǎichǒuqióng or 矮丑矬 ǎichǒucuó) – The opposite of gāofùshuài below, the least ideal
 Tall, rich and handsome (高富帅 gāofùshuài) – This is the opposite of "ǎichǒuqióng" or “diaosi”. Used to describe men with great wealth, a perfect body, as well as high qualifications and social status—ideal characteristics in mainland China. The word comes from an animated TV series, “Tall, Rich and Handsome,” in which the protagonist's name was “Tall, Rich and Handsome.” This slang has become widely used on the internet, symbolizing the perfect man that many women in China dream of marrying.
 Too tired to love (累觉不爱 lèijuébùài) – This slang phrase is a literal abbreviation of the Chinese phrase “too tired to fall in love anymore.” It originated from an article on the Douban website posted by a 13-year-old boy who grumbled about his single status and expressed his weariness and frustration towards romantic love. The article went viral, and the phrase was subsequently used as a sarcastic way to convey depression when encountering misfortunes or setbacks in life.
 Normal and confident males, usually used by Chinese feminists (普信男 pǔxìnnán）. Chinese feminists use this term to describe arrogant males
 White complexion, rich, and beautiful (白富美 báifùměi) – Female equivalent of gāofùshuài. The ideal girlfriend or wife
 Get rid of single status (脱单,tuōdān) – Getting rid of single status, no longer single
 Go to surf (去浪,qùlàng) – To hang out
 Setting a goal (立flag, lìflag) – Setting a goal to achieve; can also be setting a goal and will fail to achieve it due to circumstances

Neologisms 
 50 Cent Party (五毛党 wǔmáo dǎng) – Internet users paid by the government or the Communist Party to post comments
 US Penny Party (美分党 Měifēn dǎng) – Internet users paid by foreign governments or parties to post comments
 Little Fresh Meat (小鲜肉 xiǎo xiānròu) – Young, cute, handsome male idol, of around 12 to 25 years old. Originally used for stars, now used more generally by extension
 Lesbian (拉拉 lālā) – from 拉 (pinyin: lā), meaning to hold hands.
 Loser (屌丝 diǎosī) – “Diaosi” is used to describe young males born into a poor family and are unable to change the circumstances of their poverty. People usually use this phrase in an ironic and self-deprecating way. For example, someone might say “I am a diaosi” with a sigh when they see wealthy people with private cars and luxurious houses. The origin of this slang is unknown, but this slang is widely used today on the internet, and can be said to reflect that many people feel upset and discontented as they fail to change their lives no matter how much effort they have put in.
 Goddess (女神 nǚshén) – Used to describe phenomenal beauties. Everyday beauties would usually not get this attached to their name or how they're described. 
 Masculine woman (女汉子 nǚ hànzi) – The phrase nühanzi literally means "female man," and refers to women who possess traditionally masculine personality traits such as being brave and more independent than other girls. They eschew makeup or do not like go shopping. Some are even able to repair electrical appliances. More importantly, these women do not have any boyfriends. The emergence of this type of female reflects the increasing social and economic status of women.
 OK (妥妥的 tuǒtuǒde) – OK, no problem, etc.
 You understand ... (你懂的 nǐ dǒngde) – "I don't need to go on about this because you already understand."
 Act cute(卖萌 mài méng) – To purposefully pretend to be cute. Usually used by people jokingly when posting selfies or asking for things from others
 Sounds pretty awesome without any understanding (不明觉厉 bù míng jué lì) – Refers to any situation where something you hear sounds awesome even though you know nothing about it.
 Nothing to say (也是醉了 yě shì zuì le) – A way to gently express your frustrations with someone or something that is completely unreasonable and unacceptable
 Feel the body become empty (感觉身体被掏空 gǎn jué shēn tǐ bèi tāo kōng – Expressing of feeling very tired because of something. This slang comes from an advertisement for a health supplement
 Amazing (厉害了 lìhàilě) – Used on someone is doing something amazing. Always used with "my bro" 
 My Bro (我的哥 wò de gē) – Sign with emotion when something surprising happens
 Whatever floats your boat (你开心就好) – Literally means you're happy and that's ok. Usually used to make fun of friends who're in a bad situation, for instance, failing an exam.
 Angry or not? (气不气?) – Basically like "You mad, bro?," usually used in competitive video games. 
 I don't know (我母鸡啊) – "母鸡" in Mandarin, pronounced "冇計" in Cantonese, meaning "don't know" or “no idea.”
 The one to be blamed (黑锅俠 hēiguōxiá) – Internet slang for people who usually take responsibilities for others faults (背黑锅 Bei Hei Guo)
 Single Dog (单身狗 dānshēngǒu) – The term that single people in China use to poke fun at themselves for being single
 Slash Youth (斜杠青年 xiégàngqīngnían) – Slash here means having multiple identities or careers. Youth refers to young people, usually from the twenties to thirties. It is used by young people to reflect the multiple part-time jobs/hobbies they undertake.
 Buddha-like mindset is a term used by Chinese youth to describe people who reject the rat race in favour of a tranquil, apathetic life. The term has been applied to numerous areas such as parenting, employment, online shopping, fans, and relationships. For Buddha-like parenting, the adherents say that "there are not that many kids who will really amount to much, so why give them an exhausting childhood?"

With altered meanings 

 Chinese aunt (中国大妈 Zhōngguó dàmā) – This phrase refers to middle-aged Chinese women who purchase large amounts of gold. On April 15, 2013, Wall Street traders decided to sell large amounts of gold which caused a substantial fall in gold prices. However, a swarm of Chinese dama (middle-aged women) bought the gold and therefore raised the world gold price significantly. Three hundred tons of gold were moved instantly in the markets which shocked many economists. While this can be said to reflect the overall improvement of living standards in China, it has also been criticized as a blind way to invest.
 Vulgar tycoon (土豪 tǔháo) – Refers to irritating online game players who buy large amounts of game weapons in order to be glorified by others. Starting from late 2013, the meaning has changed and is now widely used to describe the nouveau riche in China, people who are wealthy but less cultured.
 Weird (重口味 zhòng kǒuwèi) – Literally a "heavy taste, interest or hobby" such as in horror films, pornography, heavy metal music, extreme sports or the similar
 Excuse me?! (黑人问号; hēirénwènhào) – Literally means "black man question marks." Many Chinese people use this slang when they react to something ridiculous or are confused. It comes from a popular meme of an NBA basketball player Nick Young with a confused expression and six question marks. 
 Spare Tire (备胎,bèitāi) – Refers to the person who is reserved for a relationship.
 Big Aunt (大姨妈,dàyímā) – A woman's period
 The Eight Trigrams (八卦,bāguà) – To gossip
 Womanizer (渣男:zhānán) – lit. "scum male," a male who is a womanizer
 Cute (治愈 zhìyù) – original meaning is 'heal'. Nowadays, it's used as an adjective to describe something being cute or that  warms your heart.

Puns 

 Chinese Baptism (中国式洗礼 Zhōngguóshì xǐlǐ) – The new Chinese government. Baptism (洗礼 xǐlǐ) is a play on words referring to Xi Jinping and Li Keqiang.
 River crab (河蟹; héxiè) – Pun on héxié (和谐) meaning "harmony." Online Chinese term for Internet censorship commonly seen in forums and blogs.
 Flattering (or deceptive) photograph (照骗;zhàopiàn) – Pun on (照片;zhàopiàn) meaning "photograph." Internet slang for photos that use many filters or have otherwise been heavily altered with software like Meitu to make the subject appear more attractive than they are in real life.  Used especially to describe such photos used in online dating profiles.
 Let's do it (冲鸭 chōngyā) – Used as a verb, it means: come on, let's do it! It is a homophonic expression of the word “冲呀” (chōngya) though 呀 has been replaced with 鸭 as it looks cuter.

Borrowings

From English 
 Gay (弯的 wānde or gay) – Bent 弯的 (pinyin: wānde), the opposite of 直 (pinyin: zhí), straight. GAY, in all upper case like other Chinese internal slang taken directly from English, is also used, but only for men.
 N continuous jumps (N次跳 N cì tiào) – A reference to the Foxconn suicides, in which several Foxconn employees jumped to their deaths from the factories' high-rise dormitory buildings in early 2010. The mathematical variable n is a nod to the high rate of these deaths in early 2010, more than one per week at times. The phrase can be said to reflect the despair some people feel under the current economic conditions in China.
 Straight (直男 zhínán) – Heterosexual, used only for men.

From Japanese 
 3P – Threesome, as in the pornographic kind
 CP – Movie couple from Japanese カップリング, e.g. "Pitt and Jolie were a CP in the Smith movie."
 Little cute girl (萝莉 Japanese: loli) – To describe girls who are really cute and are as short as a little girl (between about 4'8"/1m42 and 5'4"/1m62).
 OL – office lady, a woman with an office job.
 Otaku (male, 宅男 zháinán) – Men with obsessive interests that leave no time for normal life outside the home, similar to geek or nerd in English.
 Otaku (female, 宅女 zháinǚ) – Female equivalent of 宅男 (zháinán)

Criticism 
The People’s Daily coined the term "vulgar Internet language" to refer the Internet language that "offends the moral" and suggested a blacklist to discourage the usage of them.

See also
List of Internet phenomena in China
Mandarin Chinese profanity
Cantonese internet slang
Cantonese profanity

References

External links

 
Chinese culture
Chinese slang
Internet slang